George Earman House, also known as the Earman-Logan House, is a historic home located in Harrisonburg, Virginia, United States. It was built about 1822, and was originally a two-story, five-bay, brick I-house dwelling.  The main entrance was reversed to the rear three bay side by the late-19th century, and a one-story ell had been added off the former front facade.  The interior features a showy Federal interior with original painting in the first floor south parlor.

It was listed on the National Register of Historic Places in 1982.

References

Houses on the National Register of Historic Places in Virginia
Federal architecture in Virginia
Houses completed in 1822
National Register of Historic Places in Harrisonburg, Virginia
1822 establishments in Virginia
Houses in Harrisonburg, Virginia